San Ignacio Guazú, Misones, Paraguay may refer to:

San Ignacio, Misiones, Paraguay, place in Misiones, Paraguay
San Ignacio Guazú, stream in Misiones, Paraguay
San Ignacio Guazú, Misiones, alternative name for San Ignacio Guazu (Misiones), Paraguay

See also
San Ygnacio, Texas
San Ignacio Guazu (disambiguation)